Jonathan B. Keates FRSL (born 1946) is an English writer, biographer, novelist and former chairman of the Venice in Peril Fund.

Biography
Jonathan Keates was born in Paris, France, in 1946. He was educated at Bryanston School and went on to read for his undergraduate degree at Magdalen College, Oxford. He has written a number of acclaimed biographies and travel books, but his works of fiction have also received critical acclaim, most notably Allegro Postillions, for which he was awarded both the James Tait Black Memorial Prize and the Hawthornden Prize. He is a Fellow of the Royal Society of Literature. He is very interested in Venice, and speaks Italian, French, Spanish, German and Portuguese. He also writes reviews in some  magazines.

In addition, Keates was an English teacher employed by the City of London School from 1974 to 2013 and a judge of several writing competitions. Keates retired in order to focus on his chairmanship of the Venice in Peril Fund. On his exit from the school in July 2013, having given a tearful farewell speech, he was given two standing ovations by the pupils and staff, and a 200-person dinner was given in his honour.

Awards and distinctions
James Tait Black Memorial Prize (1983)
Hawthornden Prize (1983)
Fellow of the Royal Society of Literature (1992)

Bibliography

Shakespeare Country (1979)
Historic London (1979)
Canterbury Cathedral (1980)
Love of Italy (1980)
Allegro Postillions (1983)
The Companion Guide to the Shakespeare Country (1983)
Drawings and Sketches of Oxford (1983)
Handel: The Man And His Music (1985)
The Strangers' Gallery (1987)
Tuscany (1988)
Italian Journeys (1991)
Umbria (1991)
Stendhal (1994)
Venice (1994)
Purcell: A Biography (1995)
Soon to Be a Major Motion Picture (1997)
Smile Please (2001)
Short Stories (2001)
The Rough Guide History of Italy (2003)
The Siege of Venice (2005)
William III & Mary II Partners in Revolution (2015)
Messiah (2016)

Critical studies and reviews of Keates' work
 Reviews Messiah.

References

City of London School

External links
 Biography from the British Council

Living people
1946 births
Fellows of the Royal Society of Literature
Alumni of Magdalen College, Oxford
English biographers
English travel writers
20th-century English novelists
21st-century English novelists
James Tait Black Memorial Prize recipients
English male novelists
20th-century English male writers
21st-century English male writers
English male non-fiction writers
Male biographers
Handel scholars